Carboxydothermus hydrogenoformans is an extremely thermophilic anaerobic Gram-positive bacterium that has the interesting property of producing hydrogen as a waste product while feeding on carbon monoxide and water.  It also forms endospores.

It was isolated from a hot spring on the Russian volcanic island of Kunashir by Svetlichny et al. in 1991. Its complete genome was sequenced in 2005 by a team of scientists of the Institute for Genomic Research (TIGR) 

According to TIGR evolutionary biologist Jonathan Eisen, "C. hydrogenoformans is one of the fastest-growing microbes that can convert water and carbon monoxide to hydrogen." The microbe owes this to the fact that it has at least five different forms of carbon monoxide dehydrogenase.

References

External links 
 Carboxydothermus hydrogenoformans at dsmz.de
Type strain of Carboxydothermus hydrogenoformans at BacDive -  the Bacterial Diversity Metadatabase

Peptococcaceae
Bacteria described in 1991